Harry Richard Landis (12 December 1899 – 4 February 2008) was, at age 108, the older of the last two American First World War veterans. The final one was Frank Buckles, who died in 2011. John Babcock, a naturalized American, served in the Canadian Army during the war, and also survived Landis.

Biography
Landis was born to Jason and Alice Landis in Miller Township, Marion County, Missouri, between Hannibal and Palmyra, where he grew up on the family farm. He was the seventh of eight children.

Landis joined the United States Army in October 1918, and joined the Student Army Training Corps while attending Central Methodist University in Missouri. He did not complete basic training due to the war ending less than a month later. His experience of mopping the floor at an army hospital included exposure to the Spanish flu, which was actually the leading cause of death worldwide in the year 1918, killing about 75 million people. Landis was discharged in December 1918, one month after the signing of the Treaty of Versailles.

Attempting to try to enlist in World War II after the Attack on Pearl Harbor in 1941, he was rejected as "too old". Landis retired in 1959. He and his wife Eleanor, both died at Sun City Center in 2008. Harry died on 4 February, and Eleanor on 8 December aged 101.

See also

References

External links
Interview from The Ledger Online 
MSNBC report on Landis's death
Bay report on Landis's 108th birthday

1899 births
2008 deaths
United States Army personnel of World War I
American centenarians
Central Methodist University alumni
Men centenarians
People from Hillsborough County, Florida
People from Marion County, Missouri
United States Army soldiers
Military personnel from Missouri